Bernard Ralph Maybeck (February 7, 1862 – October 3, 1957) was an American architect in the Arts and Crafts Movement of the early 20th century.  He was an instructor at University of California, Berkeley.  Most of his major buildings were in the San Francisco Bay Area.

Biography 
Maybeck was born in New York City, the son of a German immigrant and studied at the Ecole des Beaux Arts in Paris, France. He moved to Berkeley, California, in 1892. He taught engineering drawing and architectural design at University of California, Berkeley from 1894 to 1903, and acted as a mentor for a number of other important California architects, including Julia Morgan and William Wurster. In 1951, he was awarded the Gold Medal of the American Institute of Architects.

Maybeck was equally comfortable producing works in the American Craftsman, Mission Revival, Gothic revival, Arts and Crafts, and Beaux-Arts styles, believing that each architectural problem required development of an entirely new solution. While working in the office of A. Page Brown in San Francisco, Maybeck probably contributed to the Mission Style California Building at the 1893 World's Columbian Exposition in Chicago and the first Mission Style chair, designed for the San Francisco Swedenborgian Church.

Many of Maybeck's buildings still stand in his long-time home city of Berkeley. The 1910 First Church of Christ, Scientist, Berkeley is designated a National Historic Landmark and is considered one of Maybeck's finest works.  A number of his works are listed on the National Register of Historic Places.

In 1914, Maybeck oversaw the building of the Maybeck Recital Hall in Berkeley, California.  Maybeck also designed the domed Palace of Fine Arts in San Francisco as part of the 1915 Panama-Pacific International Exposition, and for the same fair he carried out his vision of the lumberman's lodge, "House of Hoo Hoo", made of little more than rough-barked tree trunks arranged in delicate harmony. The Palace of Fine Arts was seen as the embodiment of Maybeck's elaboration of how Roman architecture could fit within a California context. Maybeck said that the popular success of the Palace was due to the absence of a roof connecting the rotunda to the art gallery building, along with the absence of windows in the gallery walls and the presence near the rotunda of trees, flowers and a water feature.

One of Maybeck's most interesting office buildings is the home of the Family Service Agency of San Francisco, offices at 1010 Gough Street. This building, constructed in 1928, is on the city's Historic Building Register and still serves as Family Service headquarters. Some of his larger residential projects, most notably a few in the hills of Berkeley, California (see esp. La Loma Park), have been compared to the ultimate bungalows of the architects Greene and Greene. In 1928, the Harrison Memorial Library was designed by California architect Maybeck in a Spanish Eclectic style and built by Michael J. Murphy.

Maybeck had many ideas about town planning that he elaborated throughout his career. As a citizen of Berkeley from the 1890s, he was intimately involved in the Hillside Club. His associations and work there helped evolve ideas about hillside communities. Maybeck developed a number of firm beliefs in how civilization and the land should relate to each other. Two overriding principles would be: 1) the primacy of the landscape - geology, flora and fauna were not to be subdued by architecture so much as enhanced by architecture 2) roads should pattern the existing grade and not be an imposition upon it. There were other principles he would elucidate, such as a shared public landscape, but these were key, and helped Berkeley evolve into a paradigm for hillside living that was organic and unique. Maybeck's visions for communities in the East Bay were also a conscientious counterpoint to across the bay where in San Francisco city planning was much more conventional, forced, and regimented into expansive grids of streets. Its grids, imposed in places on very steep grades, resulted in extremely steep streets, sidewalks and urban transitions, some almost comically so.

Maybeck was not doctrinaire however. His views reflected his wide interests and experience. Maybeck would play with more formal Beaux Arts planning principles on less steep grades, as his Palace of Fine Arts and numerous proposals for the University of California, Berkeley campus, San Francisco, and the Loch Lin General Plan for Principia College in Missouri, would reflect.

He also developed a comprehensive town plan for the company town of Brookings, Oregon, a clubhouse at the Bohemian Grove, and many of the buildings on the campus of Principia College in Elsah, Illinois.

A lifetime fascination with drama and the theatre can be seen in much of Maybeck's work.  In his spare time, he was known to create costumes, and also designed sets for the amateur productions at Berkeley's Hillside Club.

Bernard Maybeck died in 1957 and is buried in the Mountain View Cemetery in Oakland, California.

Works

Notable works include:
 Charles Keeler House & Studio (house 1895, studio 1902) — Maybeck's first private client, Berkeley Hills, Highland Place, North Berkeley, California.
 Swedenborgian Church (1895)  — 3200 Washington Street at Lyon Street, Pacific Heights, San Francisco, California, NRHP-listed.
 Wyntoon, with architect Julia Morgan (1898−1902) — private estate of Phoebe Apperson Hearst−Hearst family, rural Siskiyou County, California.
 Boke House (1902) — for George Henry Boke (1869–1929), at 23 Panoramic Way, Panoramic Hill Historic District, Berkeley, California.
 Faculty Club (1902, later additions by Maybeck and John Galen Howard) — University of California, Berkeley campus, NRHP-listed.
 Grove Clubhouse−Maybeck Lodge (1903–04)  — Bohemian Grove, the Bohemian Club 'campground' on the Russian River, Monte Rio, California.
 Howard B. Gates House (1904) — Mission Revival style, at 62 South Thirteenth Street, San Jose, California.
 The Outdoor Art Club (1904) — 1 West Blithedale Avenue, Mill Valley, Marin County, California, NRHP-listed.
 Hillside Club (1906, rebuilt 1924) — Cedar Street, North Berkeley, a City of Berkeley Landmark.
The original 1906 clubhouse was destroyed in the 1923 Berkeley Fire. Maybeck's brother-in-law, John White, designed the current clubhouse in 1924.
 Goslinsky Residence (1909) — 3233 Pacific Avenue, San Francisco, California
 Roos House (1909)  — Tudor Revival and other styles, at 3500 Jackson Street at Locust, Pacific Heights, San Francisco, California, NRHP-listed & San Francisco Landmark.
 First Church of Christ, Scientist (Berkeley, California) (1910) — 2619 Dwight Way, Berkeley, California, NRHP-listed
 Rose Walk (1912) — public outdoor stairway and landscape, La Loma Park district, North Berkeley, California.
 Chick House (1913) — for Guy Hyde Chick (1868–1930), in Chabot Canyon of the Berkeley Hills, at 7133 Chabot Road, Oakland Hills district of Oakland, California.
 Kennedy-Nixon house (1914, rebuilt 1923) — 1537 Euclid Avenue, La Loma Park district, North Berkeley, Berkeley, California. 
 Maybeck Recital Hall (1914, rebuilt 1923) — part of Kennedy-Nixon house complex, Euclid Avenue at Buena Vista Way, North Berkeley.
 Palace of Fine Arts (1915, rebuilt 1965) — Panama-Pacific Exposition building, 3301 Lyon Street, Marina District, San Francisco, California, NRHP-listed.
 Parsons Memorial Lodge (1915) — Sierra Club lodge at Tuolumne Meadows, Yosemite National Park, California, NRHP-listed.
 Lynwood Pacific Electric Railway Depot (1917) — Lynwood, South Los Angeles region, California.
 Byington Ford House (1922) — Pebble Beach, California
 Bernard Maybeck house and studio (1924) — architect's own residence and studio, Maybeck Twin Drive, La Loma Park district, North Berkeley, California.
 Phoebe Hearst Gymnasium for Women, with architect Julia Morgan (1927)  — Oxford Street, University of California, Berkeley campus, NRHP-listed.
 Earle C. Anthony Packard Showroom (1927) — Beaux-Arts style, on Van Ness Avenue at Ellis Street, San Francisco, the present day British Motors dealership, San Francisco Landmark.
 Earle C. Anthony House (1927) — Medieval, Gothic, Spanish and Tudor Revival elements, at 3431-3441 Waverly Drive, Los Feliz district, Los Angeles, California. 
Later the Countess Bernardine Murphy Donohue estate (c.1950−c.1970) with gardens designed by Florence Yoch & Lucile Council. Later the Convent of the Sisters of the Immaculate Heart of Mary, and the Cardinal Timothy Manning House of Prayer for Priests complex (1975−2011).
 Earle C. Anthony Packard Showroom (1928), remodel of 1911 Greene and Greene design — on Olympic Boulevard and Hope Street, South Park district of Downtown Los Angeles, the present day Packard Lofts condos.
 Associated Charities of San Francisco Building (1928) — 1010 Gough Street at Eddy, San Francisco, the present day Family Service Agency of San Francisco center, San Francisco Landmark.

Historic districts with Maybeck designed works include
 Panoramic Hill Historic District  — in the Berkeley Hills, in Berkeley and Oakland Hills, Oakland, California, NRHP-listed.
Maybeck designed residences include the Boke House (1902) at 23 Panoramic Way
 Principia College Historic District  —  River Road, Elsah, Illinois, NRHP-listed.
Maybeck designed the 'English village' campus master plan, and campus buildings including the Colonial Revival style Chapel (1931-34) at 1 Maybeck Place.
 Professorville Historic District  — roughly bounded by Embarcadero Road, Addison Avenue, and Emerson and Cowper Streets, in Palo Alto, California, NRHP-listed.
Maybeck designed the "Sunbonnet House" (1899, restored 2004) for Emma Kellogg.
 Tahoe Meadows Historic District (founded 1924) — first planned open space community in Lake Tahoe region, on US 50 between Ski Run Boulevard and Park Avenue, South Lake Tahoe, El Dorado County, California, NRHP-listed.

References

External links 

 Maybeck Foundation—a non-profit preservation and education foundation
 Maybeck at Principia College
 A High School named after Bernard Maybeck in Berkeley

Selected works
 Maybeck's Work at Brookings Oregon and a selection of his essays and drawings
 Pictures of the First Church of Christ, Scientist in Berkeley
 Pictures of Family Service Agency headquarters in San Francisco
 FSA Building on list of SF Landmarks
 Photograph of the interior of Maybeck Lodge at the Bohemian Grove
 Roy Flamm Photographs of Buildings Designed by Bernard Maybeck, ca. 1950-1955, The Bancroft Library
 Archival holdings of the Environmental Design Archive of UC Berkeley

Architects from California
 
Arts and Crafts architects
Beaux Arts architects
Spanish Revival architects
Mediterranean Revival architects
1862 births
1957 deaths
American people of German descent
Burials at Mountain View Cemetery (Oakland, California)
American alumni of the École des Beaux-Arts
Artists from Berkeley, California
Culture of Berkeley, California
University of California, Berkeley faculty
Architecture in the San Francisco Bay Area
Recipients of the AIA Gold Medal